The 2013 Tim Hortons Brier, the Canadian men's national curling championship, was held from March 2 to 10 at Rexall Place in Edmonton, Alberta. This edition of the Brier marked the thirteenth time that Alberta has hosted the Brier, and the sixth time that Edmonton has hosted the Brier.

In the final, Brad Jacobs of Northern Ontario defeated three-time Brier champion Jeff Stoughton of Manitoba with a score of 11–4 to win his first Brier title and Northern Ontario's first title since 1985. Jacobs and his team will represent Canada at the 2013 Ford World Men's Curling Championship in Victoria, British Columbia.

Event summary
The eighty-fourth edition of the Canadian Men's Curling Championship saw one of the strongest fields in the past few years assembled. Defending champion Glenn Howard of Ontario made his eighth consecutive and record fifteenth overall appearance at the Brier. Veterans Kevin Martin of Alberta, an Olympic gold medalist and former world champion, and Jeff Stoughton of Manitoba, a former world champion, made their twelfth and tenth appearances at the Brier, respectively. Former bronze medalist and Olympic gold medalist Brad Gushue made his tenth appearance at the Brier representing Newfoundland and Labrador, while former Brier champion Jean-Michel Ménard returned to compete for a fifth time. Northern Ontario's Brad Jacobs, a former bronze medallist and perennial competitor, and Jamie Koe of the Northwest Territories and Yukon, who made a breakout playoffs finish last year, returned to the Brier once more. Brock Virtue of Saskatchewan and Andrew Bilesky of British Columbia made their first appearances at the Brier, while veterans James Grattan of New Brunswick, Eddie MacKenzie of Prince Edward Island, and Paul Flemming of Nova Scotia made repeat appearances at the Brier.

Manitoba, Newfoundland and Labrador, Northern Ontario, Ontario, and Quebec shot out to the top of the pack early on, while Alberta struggled to find its rhythm in the beginning draws, dropping four games out of the first five. As the tournament progressed, the top teams began to battle for rankings, and after the halfway point, only Ontario remained undefeated. Alberta began to string up a win streak, and scored crucial victories as they moved up on the standings. At the end of the round robin, Ontario had clinched the first seed in the standings, with only one loss to Alberta in the round robin. Newfoundland and Labrador and Northern Ontario secured spots in the page 3 vs. 4 game with two wins in the last day, while Manitoba's win in the last draw propelled them to the page 1 vs. 2 game against Ontario, simultaneously dropping Alberta out of playoff contention.

In the page playoffs, Ontario's Glenn Howard and Manitoba's Jeff Stoughton faced off in a battle of veterans, which began as a close game and ended with a win for Manitoba after a missed shot by Howard gave Stoughton a shot for three and for the win, making the final score 7–6. Brad Jacobs of Northern Ontario and Brad Gushue of Newfoundland and Labrador played to claim a spot in the semifinals. Jacobs held a slight advantage throughout the game, but Gushue made a comeback in the tenth to force an extra end, in which Jacobs drew for the 6–5 win. Jacobs then played Howard in the semifinal for a spot in the final, and early on, both teams played a back-and-forth game. However, a steal of two for Northern Ontario in the fifth, along with more missed shots from Howard and strong play from Jacobs, led to an upset win by Jacobs with a score of 9–7. Howard and Gushue then played for the bronze in another tight game which ended in Howard making a draw for the win in an extra end, resulting in a score of 7–6. Jacobs and Stoughton then played for the championship, in what turned out to be a mostly one-sided affair after excellent shots by Jacobs led to steals and multi-point ends against a struggling Manitoba team. Jacobs and team scored four straight points in the second half of the game, sealing it up in nine ends with a score of 11–4.

Teams

Team rankings

Round-robin standings
Final round-robin standings

Round-robin results
All times listed in Mountain Standard Time (UTC−7).

Draw 1
Saturday, March 2, 1:30 pm

Draw 2
Saturday, March 2, 6:30 pm

Draw 3
Sunday, March 3, 8:30 am

Draw 4
Sunday, March 3, 1:30 pm

Draw 5
Sunday, March 3, 6:30 pm

Draw 6
Monday, March 4, 1:30 pm

Draw 7
Monday, March 4, 6:30 pm

Draw 8
Tuesday, March 5, 1:30 pm

Draw 9
Tuesday, March 5, 6:30 pm

Draw 10
Wednesday, March 6, 1:30 pm

Draw 11
Wednesday, March 6, 8:00 pm

Draw 12
Thursday, March 7, 8:30 am

Draw 13
Thursday, March 7, 1:30 pm

Draw 14
Thursday, March 7, 7:30 pm

Draw 15
Friday, March 8, 8:30 am

Draw 16
Friday, March 8, 1:30 pm

Draw 17
Friday, March 8, 7:30 pm

Playoffs

1 vs. 2
Saturday, March 9, 1:30 pm

3 vs. 4
Saturday, March 9, 6:30 pm

Semifinal
Sunday, March 10, 8:30 am

Bronze medal game
Sunday, March 10, 1:30 pm

Final
Sunday, March 10, 6:30 pm

Statistics

Top 5 player percentages
Round robin only

Team percentages
Round Robin only

Perfect games

Awards
The awards and all-star teams are listed as follows:

All-Star Teams
First Team
Skip:  Glenn Howard, Ontario
Third:  Wayne Middaugh, Ontario
Second:  Brent Laing, Ontario
Lead  Mark Nichols, Manitoba

Second Team
Skip:  Brad Gushue, Newfoundland and Labrador
Third:  Jon Mead, Manitoba
Second:  Marc Kennedy, Alberta
Lead:  Craig Savill, Ontario

Ross Harstone Sportsmanship Award
 Paul Flemming, Nova Scotia skip

Scotty Harper Award
Kevin Palmer, The Curling News, for the best curling story of 2012

Paul McLean Award
Larry Wood, curling journalist, editor of The Tankard Times, Canadian Curling Hall of Fame inductee

Hec Gervais Most Valuable Player Award
 Brad Jacobs, Northern Ontario skip

References

External links

 
Sport in Edmonton
Curling in Alberta
The Brier
Tim Hortons Brier
Tim Hortons Brier
Tim Hortons Brier